The Albatros C.V was a German military reconnaissance aircraft which saw service during World War I.

Design and development
The C.V was Albatros Flugzeugwerke's first revision of their B- and C-type reconnaissance aircraft since Ernst Heinkel left the firm for Hansa-Brandenburg. While retaining the same basic layout as the Heinkel-designed aircraft, the C.V  featured considerably refined streamlining. The forward fuselage was skinned in sheet metal and a neat, rounded spinner covered the propeller boss. Power was provided by the new Mercedes D.IV, a geared eight-cylinder engine.

Operational history
The initial production version, designated C.V/16, suffered from heavy control forces and inadequate engine cooling. Albatros therefore produced the C.V/17 with a new lower wing, as well as balanced ailerons and elevators. The fuselage-mounted radiators were replaced by a single flush radiator in the upper wing.

These changes improved both handling qualities and engine cooling, but the downfall of the C.V was the unreliable Mercedes D.IV engine, which suffered from chronic crankshaft failures. The C.V was therefore replaced in production by the Albatros C.VII.

Variants
C.V/16
Original design with radiators on fuselage sides.
C.V/17
Revised aircraft with radiator on upper wing, and redesigned lower wing.

Operators

Luftstreitkräfte

Specifications (C.V)

See also

References

 
 

Single-engined tractor aircraft
Biplanes
1910s German military reconnaissance aircraft
C.05
Aircraft first flown in 1916